Rondedraai is a town in Harry Gwala District Municipality in the KwaZulu-Natal province of South Africa.

References

Populated places in the Umzimkhulu Local Municipality